Andrew Mwesigwa (born 24 April 1984) is a Ugandan former international footballer who played as a defender.

Career

Club career
Mwesigwa began his career in 2002 with Ugandan side Villa SC, before moving to Icelandic club ÍBV in 2006.

After spending the 2010 season with Chinese side Chongqing Lifan, in February 2011 he signed a two-year contract with Kazakhstan Premier League side FC Ordabasy.

In February 2013, Mwesigwa extended his contract with Ordabasy, after winning the Kazakhstan Super Cup with them in 2012. Mwesigwa left Ordabasy in December 2014.

In May 2015, Mwesigwa was reported to have signed a three-year contract with Bidvest Wits of the Premier Soccer League, but contract negotiations broke down and Mwesigwa did not sign for Bidvest Wits.

Later on in 2015, Mwesigwa played for Yenicami Ağdelen in the KTFF Süper Lig, before leaving in January 2016.

After leaving Yenicami Ağdelen, Mwesigwa went on trial with V.League 1 side Hà Nội, which in 2016 was moved to Ho Chi Minh City and renamed Sài Gòn F.C. He spent the 2016 season with Sài Gòn, making 23 league appearances.

In January 2017, Mwesigwa went on trial with former club FC Ordabasy.

International career
Mwesigwa made his international debut for Uganda in 2003.

Career statistics

Club

International

International goals
Scores and results list Uganda's goal tally first.

Honours
ÍBV
 1. deild karla (1): 2008
Ordabasy 
 Kazakhstan Cup (1): 2011
 Kazakhstan Super Cup (1): 2012

References

1984 births
Living people
Ugandan footballers
Uganda international footballers
SC Villa players
Íþróttabandalag Vestmannaeyja players
Chongqing Liangjiang Athletic F.C. players
FC Ordabasy players
Chinese Super League players
Kazakhstan Premier League players
Association football defenders
Ugandan expatriate footballers
Expatriate footballers in Iceland
Expatriate footballers in China
Expatriate footballers in Kazakhstan
Expatriate footballers in Vietnam
Ugandan expatriate sportspeople in Iceland
Ugandan expatriate sportspeople in China
Ugandan expatriate sportspeople in Kazakhstan
Ugandan expatriate sportspeople in Vietnam
Hanoi FC players
V.League 1 players
People from Kamuli District